The Hebrew calendar, also called the Jewish calendar, is a lunisolar calendar used today for Jewish religious observance, and as an official calendar of the state of Israel. It determines the dates for Jewish holidays and the appropriate public reading of Torah portions, yahrzeits (dates to commemorate the death of a relative), and daily Psalm readings, among many ceremonial uses. In Israel, it is used for religious purposes, provides a time frame for agriculture, and is an official calendar for civil holidays, alongside the Gregorian calendar.

The present Hebrew calendar is the result of a process of development, including a Babylonian influence. Until the Tannaitic period (approximately 10–220 CE), the calendar employed a new crescent moon, with an additional month normally added every two or three years to correct for the difference between the lunar year of twelve lunar months and the solar year. The year in which it was added was based on observation of natural agriculture-related events in ancient Israel. Through the Amoraic period (200–500 CE) and into the Geonic period, this system was gradually displaced by the mathematical rules of the Metonic cycle used today. Maimonides' work also replaced counting "years since the destruction of the Temple" with the modern creation-era .

The Hebrew lunar year is about 11 days shorter than the solar year and uses the 19-year Metonic cycle to bring it into line with the solar year, with the addition of an intercalary month every two or three years, for a total of seven times per 19 years. Even with this intercalation, the average Hebrew calendar year is longer by about 6 minutes and 40 seconds than the current mean tropical year, so that every 216 years the Hebrew calendar will fall a day behind the current mean tropical year.

The epoch of this era is the moment when, according to the Genesis creation narrative, the world was created.

History

Basic chronology in the biblical period
From very early times, the Babylonian calendar was in wide use by the countries of the Near East. The structure, which was also used by the Israelites, was based on lunar months with the intercalation of an additional month to bring the cycle closer to the solar cycle, although there is no mention of this additional month anywhere in the Hebrew Bible.

Month names

Biblical references to the pre-exilic calendar include ten of the twelve months identified by number rather than by name. Prior to the Babylonian captivity, the names of only four months are referred to in the Tanakh:
Aviv – first month
Ziv – second month
Ethanim – seventh month and
Bul – eighth month.

All of these are believed to be Canaanite names. The last three of these names are only mentioned in connection with the building of the First Temple and Håkan Ulfgard suggests that the use of what are rarely used Canaanite (or in the case of Ethanim perhaps Northwest Semitic) names indicates that "the author is consciously utilizing an archaizing terminology, thus giving the impression of an ancient story...".

During the Babylonian captivity, the Jewish people adopted the Babylonian names for the months. The Babylonian calendar descended directly from the Sumerian calendar. These Babylonian month-names (such as Nisan, Iyyar, Tammuz, Ab, Elul, Tishri and Adar) are shared with the modern Syrian calendar (currently used in the Arabic-speaking countries of the Fertile Crescent) and the modern Assyrian calendar, indicating a common origin. The origin is thought to be the Babylonian calendar.

Past methods of dividing years
According to some Christian and Karaite sources, the tradition in ancient Israel was that 1 Nisan would not start until the barley is ripe, being the test for the onset of spring. If the barley was not ripe, an intercalary month would be added before Nisan.

In the 1st century, Josephus stated that while –
Moses...appointed Nisan...as the first month for the festivals...the commencement of the year for everything relating to divine worship, but for selling and buying and other ordinary affairs he preserved the ancient order [i. e. the year beginning with Tishrei]."

Edwin Thiele has concluded that the ancient northern Kingdom of Israel counted years using the ecclesiastical new year starting on 1 Aviv (Nisan), while the southern Kingdom of Judah counted years using the civil new year starting on 1 Tishrei. The practice of the Kingdom of Israel was also that of Babylon, as well as other countries of the region. The practice of Judah is continued in modern Judaism.

Past methods of numbering years
Before the adoption of the current Anno Mundi year numbering system, other systems were used. In early times, the years were counted from some significant event such as the Exodus. During the period of the monarchy, it was the widespread practice in western Asia to use era year numbers according to the accession year of the monarch of the country involved. This practice was followed by the united kingdom of Israel, kingdom of Judah, kingdom of Israel, Persia, and others. Besides, the author of Kings coordinated dates in the two kingdoms by giving the accession year of a monarch in terms of the year of the monarch of the other kingdom, though some commentators note that these dates do not always synchronise. Other era dating systems have been used at other times. For example, Jewish communities in the Babylonian diaspora counted the years from the first deportation from Israel, that of Jehoiachin in 597 BCE. The era year was then called "year of the captivity of Jehoiachin".

During the Hellenistic Maccabean period, Seleucid era counting was used, at least in Land of Israel (under Greek influence at the time). The Books of the Maccabees used Seleucid era dating exclusively, as did Josephus writing in the Roman period. From the 1st-10th centuries, the center of world Judaism was in the Middle East (primarily Iraq and Palestine), and Jews in these regions also used Seleucid era dating, which they called the "Era of Contracts [or Documents]". The Talmud states:

Rav Aha bar Jacob then put this question: How do we know that our Era [of Documents] is connected with the Kingdom of Greece at all? Why not say that it is reckoned from the Exodus from Egypt, omitting the first thousand years and giving the years of the next thousand? In that case, the document is really post-dated!Said Rav Nahman: In the Diaspora the Greek Era alone is used.He [Rav Aha] thought that Rav Nahman wanted to dispose of him anyhow, but when he went and studied it thoroughly he found that it is indeed taught [in a Baraita]: In the Diaspora the Greek Era alone is used.

The use of the era of documents (i.e., Seleucid era) continued till the 16th century in the East, and was employed even in the 19th century among the Jews of Yemen.

Occasionally in Talmudic writings, reference was made to other starting points for eras, such as destruction era dating, being the number of years since the 70 CE destruction of the Second Temple. In the 8th and 9th centuries, as the center of Jewish life moved from Babylonia to Europe, counting using the Seleucid era "became meaningless", and thus was replaced by the anno mundi system. There is indication that Jews of the Rhineland in the early Middle Ages used the "years after the destruction of the Temple".

Leap months
When the observational form of the calendar was in use, whether or not an embolismic month was announced after the "last month" (Adar) depended on 'aviv [i.e., the ripeness of barley], fruits of trees, and the equinox. On two of these grounds it should be intercalated, but not on one of them alone. It may be noted that in the Bible the name of the first month, Aviv, literally means "spring". Thus, if Adar was over and spring had not yet arrived, an additional month was observed.

Determining the new month in the Mishnaic period

The Tanakh contains several commandments related to the keeping of the calendar and the lunar cycle, and records changes that have taken place to the Hebrew calendar. Numbers 10:10 stresses the importance in Israelite religious observance of the new month (Hebrew: , Rosh Chodesh, "beginning of the month"): "... in your new moons, ye shall blow with the trumpets over your burnt-offerings..." Similarly in Numbers 28:11. "The beginning of the month" meant the appearance of a new moon, and in Exodus 12:2. "This month is to you".

According to the Mishnah and Tosefta, in the Maccabean, Herodian, and Mishnaic periods, new months were determined by the sighting of a new crescent, with two eyewitnesses required to testify to the Sanhedrin to having seen the new lunar crescent at sunset. The practice in the time of Gamaliel II (c. 100 CE) was for witnesses to select the appearance of the moon from a collection of drawings that depicted the crescent in a variety of orientations, only a few of which could be valid in any given month. These observations were compared against calculations.

At first the beginning of each Jewish month was signaled to the communities of Israel and beyond by fires lit on mountaintops, but after the Samaritans began to light false fires, messengers were sent. The inability of the messengers to reach communities outside Israel before mid-month High Holy Days (Succot and Passover) led outlying communities to celebrate scriptural festivals for two days rather than one, observing the second feast-day of the Jewish diaspora because of uncertainty of whether the previous month ended after 29 or 30 days.
It has been noted that the procedures described in the Mishnah and Tosefta are all plausible procedures for regulating an empirical lunar calendar. Fire-signals, for example, or smoke-signals, are known from the pre-exilic Lachish ostraca. Furthermore, the Mishnah contains laws that reflect the uncertainties of an empirical calendar. Mishnah Sanhedrin, for example, holds that when one witness holds that an event took place on a certain day of the month, and another that the same event took place on the following day, their testimony can be held to agree, since the length of the preceding month was uncertain. Another Mishnah takes it for granted that it cannot be known in advance whether a year's lease is for twelve or thirteen months. Hence it is a reasonable conclusion that the Mishnaic calendar was actually used in the Mishnaic period.

The accuracy of the Mishnah's claim that the Mishnaic calendar was also used in the late Second Temple period is less certain. One scholar has noted that there are no laws from Second Temple period sources that indicate any doubts about the length of a month or of a year. This led him to propose that the priests must have had some form of computed calendar or calendrical rules that allowed them to know in advance whether a month would have 30 or 29 days, and whether a year would have 12 or 13 months.

The fixing of the calendar

Between 70 and 1178 CE, the observation-based calendar was gradually replaced by a mathematically calculated one.

The Talmuds indicate at least the beginnings of a transition from a purely empirical to a computed calendar. Samuel of Nehardea (c. 165-254) stated that he could determine the dates of the holidays by calculation rather than observation. According to a statement attributed to Yose (late 3rd century), Purim could not fall on a Sabbath nor a Monday, lest Yom Kippur fall on a Friday or a Sunday. This indicates that, by the time of the redaction of the Jerusalem Talmud (c. 400 CE), there were a fixed number of days in all months from Adar to Elul, also implying that the extra month was already a second Adar added before the regular Adar. Elsewhere, Shimon ben Pazi is reported to have counseled "those who make the computations" not to set Rosh Hashana or Hoshana Rabbah on Shabbat. This indicates that there was a group who "made computations" and controlled, to some extent, the day of the week on which Rosh Hashana would fall.

There is a tradition, first mentioned by Hai Gaon (died 1038 CE), that Hillel II was responsible for the new calculated calendar with a fixed intercalation cycle "in the year 670 of the Seleucid era" (i.e., 358–359 CE). Later writers, such as Nachmanides, explained Hai Gaon's words to mean that the entire computed calendar was due to Hillel II in response to persecution of Jews. Maimonides (12th century) stated that the Mishnaic calendar was used "until the days of Abaye and Rava" (c. 320–350 CE), and that the change came when "the land of Israel was destroyed, and no permanent court was left." Taken together, these two traditions suggest that Hillel II (whom they identify with the mid-4th-century Jewish patriarch Ioulos, attested in a letter of the Emperor Julian, and the Jewish patriarch Ellel, mentioned by Epiphanius) instituted the computed Hebrew calendar because of persecution. H. Graetz linked the introduction of the computed calendar to a sharp repression following a failed Jewish insurrection that occurred during the rule of the Christian emperor Constantius and Gallus. A later writer, S. Lieberman, argued instead that the introduction of the fixed calendar was due to measures taken by Christian Roman authorities to prevent the Jewish patriarch from sending calendrical messengers.

Both the tradition that Hillel II instituted the complete computed calendar, and the theory that the computed calendar was introduced due to repression or persecution, have been questioned. Furthermore, two Jewish dates during post-Talmudic times (specifically in 506 and 776) are impossible under the rules of the modern calendar, indicating that some of its arithmetic rules were established in Babylonia during the times of the Geonim (7th to 8th centuries).

Except for the epoch year number (the fixed reference point at the beginning of year 1, which at that time was one year later than the epoch of the modern calendar), the calendar rules reached their current form by the beginning of the 9th century, as described by the Persian Muslim astronomer Muhammad ibn Musa al-Khwarizmi in 823. Al-Khwarizmi's study of the Jewish calendar describes the 19-year intercalation cycle,  the rules for determining on what day of the week the first day of the month Tishrei shall fall, the interval between the Jewish era (creation of Adam) and the Seleucid era, and the rules for determining the mean longitude of the sun and the moon using the Jewish calendar. Not all the rules were in place by 835.

In 921, Aaron ben Meïr proposed changes to the calendar. Though the proposals were rejected, they indicate that all of the rules of the modern calendar (except for the epoch) were in place before that date. In 1000, the Muslim chronologist al-Biruni described all of the modern rules of the Hebrew calendar, except that he specified three different epochs used by various Jewish communities being one, two, or three years later than the modern epoch.

In 1178, Maimonides included all the rules for the calculated calendar and their scriptural basis, including the modern epochal year, in his work Mishneh Torah. Today, these rules are generally used by Jewish communities throughout the world.

Components

Days
The same definition appears in the Bible in Leviticus 23:32, where the holiday of Yom Kippur is defined as lasting "from evening to evening". The days are therefore figured locally. Halachically, the previous day ends and a new one starts when three stars are visible in the sky. The time between true sunset and the time when the three stars are visible (known as tzait ha'kochavim) is known as bein hashmashot, and there are differences of opinion as to which day it falls into for some uses. This may be relevant, for example, in determining the date of birth of a child born during that gap.

Instead of the international date line convention, there are varying opinions as to where the day changes. One opinion uses the antimeridian of Jerusalem (located at 144°47' W, passing through eastern Alaska). Other opinions exist as well. (See International date line in Judaism.)

The end of the Shabbat and other Jewish holidays is based on nightfall (Tzeth haKochabim) which occurs some amount of time, typically 42 to 72 minutes, after sunset. According to Maimonides, nightfall occurs when three medium-sized stars become visible after sunset. By the 17th century, this had become three second-magnitude stars. The modern definition is when the center of the sun is 7° below the geometric (airless) horizon, somewhat later than civil twilight at 6°.

Hours
Judaism uses multiple systems for dividing hours. A part is  seconds ( minute). These measures are not generally used for everyday purposes. Its best known use is for calculating and announcing the molad.

In another system, the daytime period is divided into 12 relative hours (sha'ah z'manit, also sometimes called "halachic hours"). Therefore an hour can be less than 60 minutes in winter, and more than 60 minutes in summer; similarly, the 6th hour ends at solar noon, which generally differs from 12:00. Relative hours are used for the calculation of prayer times (zmanim); for example, the Shema must be recited in the first three relative hours of the day.

There is no clock in the Jewish scheme, so that the local civil clock is used. Although the civil clock, including the one in use in Israel, incorporates local adoptions of various conventions such as time zones, standard times and daylight saving, these have no place in the Jewish scheme. The civil clock is used only as a reference point—in expressions such as: "Shabbat starts at ...". The steady progression of sunset around the world and seasonal changes results in gradual civil time changes from one day to the next based on observable astronomical phenomena (the sunset) and not on man-made laws and conventions.

Weeks

The Hebrew week is a cycle of seven days, mirroring the seven-day period of the Book of Genesis in which the world is created. The weekly cycle runs concurrently with but independently of the monthly and annual cycles.

The weekdays start with Sunday (day 1, or Yom Rishon) and proceed to Saturday (day 7), Shabbat. Since some calculations use division, a remainder of 0 signifies Saturday.

Names of weekdays
The names for the days of the week are simply the day number within the week, with Shabbat being the seventh day. In Hebrew, these names may be abbreviated using the numerical value of the Hebrew letters, for example  (Day 1, or Yom Rishon):

The names of the days of the week are modeled on the seven days mentioned in the creation story. For example, Genesis 1:8 "... And there was evening and there was morning, a second day" corresponds to Yom Sheni meaning "second day". (However, for days 1, 6, and 7 the modern name differs slightly from the version in Genesis.)

The seventh day, Shabbat, as its Hebrew name indicates, is a day of rest in Judaism. In Talmudic Hebrew, the word Shabbat can also mean "week", so that in ritual liturgy a phrase like "Yom Reviʻi beShabbat" means "the fourth day in the week".

Days of week of holidays

The period from 1 Adar (or Adar II, in leap years) to 29 Marcheshvan contains all of the festivals specified in the Bible (Pesach, Shavuot, Rosh Hashanah, Yom Kippur, Sukkot, and Shemini Atzeret). This period is fixed, during which no adjustments are made. As a result, these holidays can only fall on the weekdays shown in the following table:

There are additional rules in the Hebrew calendar to prevent certain holidays from falling on certain days of the week. (See Rosh Hashanah postponement rules, below.) These rules are implemented by adding an extra day to Marcheshvan (making it 30 days long) or by removing one day from Kislev (making it 29 days long). Accordingly, a common Hebrew calendar year can have a length of 353, 354 or 355 days, while a leap Hebrew calendar year can have a length of 383, 384 or 385 days.

Months
The Hebrew calendar is a lunisolar calendar, meaning that months are based on lunar months, but years are based on solar years. The calendar year features twelve lunar months of twenty-nine or thirty days, with an intercalary lunar month added periodically to synchronize the twelve lunar cycles with the longer solar year. (These extra months are added seven times every nineteen years. See Leap months, below.) The beginning of each Jewish lunar month is based on the appearance of the new moon. Although originally the new lunar crescent had to be observed and certified by witnesses, the moment of the true new moon is now approximated arithmetically as the molad, which is the mean new moon to a precision of one part.

The mean period of the lunar month (precisely, the synodic month) is very close to 29.5 days. Accordingly, the basic Hebrew calendar year is one of twelve lunar months alternating between 29 and 30 days:

In leap years (such as 5779) an additional month, Adar I (30 days) is added after Shevat, while the regular Adar is referred to as "Adar II".

Justification for leap months
The insertion of the leap month mentioned above is based on the requirement that Passover—the festival celebrating the Exodus from Egypt, which took place in the spring—always occurs in the northern hemisphere's spring season. Since the adoption of a fixed calendar, intercalations in the Hebrew calendar have been assigned to fixed points in a 19-year cycle. Prior to this, the intercalation was determined empirically.

Maimonides, discussing the calendrical rules in his Mishneh Torah (1178), notes:
By how much does the solar year exceed the lunar year? By approximately 11 days. Therefore, whenever this excess accumulates to about 30 days, or a little more or less, one month is added and the particular year is made to consist of 13 months, and this is the so-called embolismic (intercalated) year. For the year could not consist of twelve months plus so-and-so many days, since it is said: "throughout the months of the year", which implies that we should count the year by months and not by days.

The Bible does not directly mention the addition of "embolismic" or intercalary months. However, without the insertion of embolismic months, Jewish festivals would gradually shift outside of the seasons required by the Torah. This has been ruled as implying a requirement for the insertion of embolismic months to reconcile the lunar cycles to the seasons, which are integral to solar yearly cycles.

Characteristics of leap months
In a regular (kesidran) year, Marcheshvan has 29 days and Kislev has 30 days. However, because of the Rosh Hashanah postponement rules (see below) Kislev may lose a day to have 29 days, and the year is called a short (chaser) year, or Marcheshvan may acquire an additional day to have 30 days, and the year is called a full (maleh) year. The calendar rules have been designed to ensure that Rosh Hashanah does not fall on a Sunday, Wednesday or Friday. This is to ensure that Yom Kippur does not directly precede or follow Shabbat, which would create practical difficulties, and that Hoshana Rabbah is not on a Shabbat, in which case certain ceremonies would be lost for a year.

The 12 lunar months of the Hebrew calendar are the normal months from new moon to new moon: the year normally contains twelve months averaging 29.52 days each. The discrepancy compared to the mean synodic month of 29.53 days is due to Adar I in a leap year always having thirty days. This means that the calendar year normally contains 354 days, roughly 11 days shorter than the solar year.

Traditionally, for the Babylonian and Hebrew lunisolar calendars, the years 3, 6, 8, 11, 14, 17, and 19 are the long (13-month) years of the Metonic cycle. This cycle also forms the basis of the Christian ecclesiastical calendar and is used for the computation of the date of Easter each year.

During leap years Adar I (or Adar Aleph—"first Adar") is added before the regular Adar. Adar I is actually considered to be the extra month, and has 30 days. Adar II (or Adar Bet—"second Adar") is the "real" Adar, and has the usual 29 days. For this reason, holidays such as Purim are observed in Adar II, not Adar I.

Years
The Hebrew calendar year conventionally begins on Rosh Hashanah. However, other dates serve as the beginning of the year for different religious purposes.

There are three qualities that distinguish one year from another: whether it is a leap year or a common year; on which of four permissible days of the week the year begins; and whether it is a deficient, regular, or complete year. Mathematically, there are 24 (2×4×3) possible combinations, but only 14 of them are valid. See #The four gates.

In Hebrew there are two common ways of writing the year number: with the thousands, called  ("major era"), and without the thousands, called  ("minor era"). Thus, the current year is written as  ‎() using the "major era" and  ‎() using the "minor era".

Anno Mundi

In 1178 CE, Maimonides wrote in the Mishneh Torah that he had chosen the epoch from which calculations of all dates should be as "the third day of Nisan in this present year ... which is the year 4938 of the creation of the world" (22 March 1178). He included all the rules for the calculated calendar and their scriptural basis, including the modern epochal year in his work, and beginning formal usage of the anno mundi era. From the eleventh century, anno mundi dating became dominant throughout most of the world's Jewish communities. Today, the rules detailed in Maimonides' calendrical code are those generally used by Jewish communities throughout the world.

Since the codification by Maimonides in 1178, the Jewish calendar has used the Anno Mundi epoch for "in the year of the world", abbreviated AM or A.M., sometimes referred to as the "Hebrew era", to distinguish it from other systems based on some computation of creation, such as the Byzantine calendar.

There is also reference in the Talmud to years since the creation based on the calculation in the Seder Olam Rabbah of Rabbi Jose ben Halafta in about 160 CE. By his calculation, based on the Masoretic Text, Adam was created in 3760 BCE, later confirmed by the Muslim chronologist al-Biruni as 3448 years before the Seleucid era. An example is the c. 8th century Baraita of Samuel.

According to rabbinic reckoning, the beginning of "year 1" is not Creation, but about one year "before" Creation, with the new moon of its first month (Tishrei) to be called molad tohu (the mean new moon of chaos or nothing). The Jewish calendar's epoch, 1 Tishrei AM 1, is equivalent to Monday, 7 October 3761 BCE in the proleptic Julian calendar, the equivalent tabular date (same daylight period) and is about one year before the traditional Jewish date of Creation on 25 Elul AM 1, based upon the Seder Olam Rabbah. Thus, adding 3760 before Rosh Hashanah or 3761 after to a Julian calendar year number starting from 1 CE will yield the Hebrew year. For earlier years there may be a discrepancy; see Missing years (Jewish calendar).

The Seder Olam Rabbah also recognized the importance of the Jubilee and Sabbatical cycles as a long-term calendrical system, and attempted at various places to fit the Sabbatical and Jubilee years into its chronological scheme.

Occasionally, Anno Mundi is styled as Anno Hebraico (AH), though this is subject to confusion with notation for the Islamic Hijri year.

The reference junction of the Sun and the Moon (Molad 1) on the day of creation is considered to be at 5 hours and 204 halakim, or 11:11:20 p.m., in the evening of Sunday, 6 October 3761 BCE.

New year

The Jewish calendar has several distinct new years, used for different purposes. The use of multiple starting dates for a year is comparable to different starting dates for civil "calendar years", "tax or fiscal years", "academic years", and so on. The Mishnah (c. 200 CE) identifies four new-year dates:

The 1st of Nisan is the new year for kings and festivals; the 1st of Elul is the new year for the cattle tithe... the 1st of Tishri is the new year for years, of the years of release and Jubilee years, for the planting and for vegetables; and the 1st of Shevat is the new year for trees—so the school of Shammai; and the school of Hillel say: On the 15th thereof.

Two of these dates are especially prominent:
 1 Nisan is the ecclesiastical new year, i.e. the date from which months and festivals are counted. Thus Passover (which begins on 15 Nisan) is described in the Torah as falling "in the first month", while Rosh Hashana (which begins on 1 Tishrei) is described as falling "in the seventh month". Since Passover is required to be celebrated in the spring, it should fall around, and normally just after, the vernal (spring) equinox. If the twelfth full moon after the previous Passover is too early compared to the equinox, a 13th leap month is inserted near the end of the previous year before the new year is set to begin. According to normative Judaism, the verses in Exodus 12:1–2 require that the months be determined by a proper court with the necessary authority to sanctify the months. Hence the court, not the astronomy, has the final decision.
 Nowadays, the day most commonly referred to as the "New Year" is 1 Tishrei (Rosh Hashanah, lit. "head of the year"), even though Tishrei is the seventh month of the ecclesiastical year. 1 Tishrei is the civil new year, and the date on which the year number advances. Tishrei marks the end of one agricultural year and the beginning of another, and thus 1 Tishrei is considered the new year for most agriculture-related commandments, including Shmita, Yovel, Maaser Rishon, Maaser Sheni, and Maaser Ani.

For the dates of the Jewish New Year see Jewish and Israeli holidays 2000–2050 or calculate using the section "Conversion between Jewish and civil calendars".

Leap years
The Jewish calendar is based on the Metonic cycle of 19 years, of which 12 are common (non-leap) years of 12 months and 7 are leap years of 13 months. To determine whether a Jewish year is a leap year, one must find its position in the 19-year Metonic cycle. This position is calculated by dividing the Jewish year number by 19 and finding the remainder. (Since there is no year 0, a remainder of 0 indicates that the year is year 19 of the cycle.)

Years 3, 6, 8, 11, 14, 17, and 19 of the Metonic cycle are leap years. To assist in remembering this sequence, some people use the mnemonic Hebrew word GUCHADZaT , where the Hebrew letters gimel-vav-het aleph-dalet-zayin-tet are used as Hebrew numerals equivalent to 3, 6, 8, 1, 4, 7, 9.

Another memory aid notes that intervals of the major scale follow the same pattern as do Jewish leap years, with do corresponding to year 19 (or 0): a whole step in the scale corresponds to two common years between consecutive leap years, and a half step to one common year between two leap years. This connection with the major scale is more plain in the context of 19 equal temperament: counting the tonic as 0, the notes of the major scale in 19 equal temperament are numbers 0 (or 19), 3, 6, 8, 11, 14, 17, the same numbers as the leap years in the Hebrew calendar.

A simple rule for determining whether a year is a leap year has been given above. However, there is another rule which not only tells whether the year is leap but also gives the fraction of a month by which the calendar is behind the seasons, useful for agricultural purposes. To determine whether year n of the calendar is a leap year, find the remainder on dividing [(7 × n) + 1] by 19. If the remainder is 6 or less it is a leap year; if it is 7 or more it is not. For example, the  The  This works because as there are seven leap years in nineteen years the difference between the solar and lunar years increases by 7/19-month per year. When the difference goes above 18/19-month this signifies a leap year, and the difference is reduced by one month.

The Jewish Talmudic Calendar assumes that a month is uniformly of the length of an average synodic month, taken as exactly 29 days (about 29.530594 days, which is less than half a second from the modern scientific estimate); it also assumes that a tropical year is exactly 12 times that, i.e., about 365.2468 days. Thus it overestimates the length of the tropical year (365.2422 days) by 0.0046 days (about 7 minutes) per year, or about one day in 216 years. This error is less than the Julian years (365.2500 days) make (0.0078 days/year, or one day in 128 years), but much more than what the Gregorian years (365.2425 days/year) make (0.0003 days/year, or one day in 3333 years).

In every 19 years, the solar and lunar calendars basically synchronize, with only about 2 hours of difference. Thus each 19 years is called a "small mahzor" in the Jewish Talmudic calendar, which is equivalent to the Greek metonic cycle, although they do not start on the same year. The year of creation according to the Rabbinical Chronology (3761 BCE) is taken as year 1 in the first Small Mahzor. The Greek cycle begins from an arbitrary year, usually from the beginning of the Common Era (Anno Domini).

If every 13 Small Mahzor is called an Iggul, because 12 times 2 hours is a day, and 30 days are a month, then in less than 30 Igguls a whole intercalary month should be removed.

The position of the years in a small Mahzor is called the golden number. The pattern of the leap years change slightly in each Iggul, but the Jewish Talmudic calendar fixed the leap years in the year with golden numbers 3, 6, 8, 11, 14, 17, 19. If a Leap year marked L, and the Following year F, and the other common year as O, then

Because the Julian years are 365 and 1/4 days, in every 28 years the weekday pattern repeats. This is called the sun cycle. The beginning of this cycle is arbitrary.

Because every 50 years is a Jubilee year, there is a yovel cycle; Because every seven years is a sabbatical year, there is a seven-year release cycle. The placement of these cycles is controversial. Historically there are enough evidences to fix the sabbatical years in the Second Temple Period. But it may not match with the sabbatical cycle derived from the biblical period; and there is no consensus on whether or not the Jubilee year is the fiftieth year or the latter half of the forty ninth year.

Rosh Hashanah postponement rules

Although there are six possible year lengths and four possible days of the week for Rosh HaShanah, only 14 of the 24 combination can occur (see #The four gates), as shown in the table to the right.

To calculate the day on which Rosh Hashanah of a given year will fall, it is necessary first to calculate the expected molad (moment of lunar conjunction or new moon) of Tishrei in that year, and then to apply a set of rules to determine whether the first day of the year must be postponed. The molad can be calculated by multiplying the number of months that will have elapsed since some (preceding) molad whose weekday is known by the mean length of a (synodic) lunar month, which is 29 days, 12 hours, and 793 parts (there are 1080 "parts" in an hour, so that one part is equal to  seconds).

In calculating the number of months that will have passed since the known molad that one uses as the starting point, one must remember to include any leap months that falls within the elapsed interval, according to the cycle of leap years. A 19-year cycle of 235 synodic months has 991 weeks 2 days 16 hours 595 parts, a common year of 12 synodic months has 50 weeks 4 days 8 hours 876 parts, while a leap year of 13 synodic months has 54 weeks 5 days 21 hours 589 parts.

The two months whose numbers of days may be adjusted, Marcheshvan and Kislev, are the eighth and ninth months of the Hebrew year, whereas Tishrei is the seventh month (in the traditional counting of the months, even though it is the first month of a new calendar year). Any adjustments needed to postpone Rosh Hashanah must be made to the adjustable months in the year that precedes the year of which the Rosh Hashanah will be the first day.

Just four potential conditions are considered to determine whether the date of Rosh Hashanah must be postponed. These are called the Rosh Hashanah postponement rules, or :

If the molad occurs at or later than noon, Rosh Hashanah is postponed a day. This is called  (literally, "old birth", i.e., late new moon).
If the molad occurs on a Sunday, Wednesday, or Friday, Rosh Hashanah is postponed a day. If the application of  would place Rosh Hashanah on one of these days, then it must be postponed a second day. This is called , an acronym that means "not [weekday] one, four, or six".

The first of these rules is referred to in the Talmud. Nowadays,  is used as a device to prevent the molad falling on the second day of the month. The second rule,, is applied for religious reasons.

Another two rules are applied much less frequently and serve to prevent impermissible year lengths. Their names are Hebrew acronyms that refer to the ways they are calculated:
 If the molad in a common year falls on a Tuesday, on or after 9 hours and 204 parts, Rosh Hashanah is postponed to Thursday.
 If the molad following a leap year falls on a Monday, on or after 15 hours and 589 parts after the Hebrew day began (for calculation purposes, this is taken to be 6 pm Sunday), Rosh Hashanah is postponed to Tuesday.

At the innovation of the sages, the calendar was arranged to ensure that Yom Kippur would not fall on a Friday or Sunday, and Hoshana Rabbah would not fall on Shabbat. These rules have been instituted because Shabbat restrictions also apply to Yom Kippur, so that if Yom Kippur were to fall on Friday, it would not be possible to make necessary preparations for Shabbat (such as candle lighting). Similarly, if Yom Kippur fell on a Sunday, it would not be possible to make preparations for Yom Kippur because the preceding day is Shabbat. Additionally, the laws of Shabbat override those of Hoshana Rabbah, so that if Hoshana Rabbah were to fall on Shabbat certain rituals that are a part of the Hoshana Rabbah service (such as carrying willows, which is a form of work) could not be performed.

To prevent Yom Kippur (10 Tishrei) from falling on a Friday or Sunday, Rosh Hashanah (1 Tishrei) cannot fall on Wednesday or Friday. Likewise, to prevent Hoshana Rabbah (21 Tishrei) from falling on a Saturday, Rosh Hashanah cannot fall on a Sunday. This leaves only four days on which Rosh Hashanah can fall: Monday, Tuesday, Thursday, and Saturday, which are referred to as the "four gates". Each day is associated with a number (its order in the week, beginning with Sunday as day 1). Numbers in Hebrew have been traditionally denominated by Hebrew letters. Thus the kevi'ah uses the letters ה ,ג ,ב and ז (representing 2, 3, 5, and 7, for Monday, Tuesday, Thursday, and Saturday) to denote the starting day of the year.

Deficient, regular, and complete years
The postponement of the year is compensated for by adding a day to Heshvan or removing one from Kislev. A Jewish common year can only have 353, 354, or 355 days. A leap year is always 30 days longer, and so can have 383, 384, or 385 days.
A  year (Hebrew for "deficient" or "incomplete") is 353 or 383 days long. Both Cheshvan and Kislev have 29 days.
A  year ("regular" or "in-order") is 354 or 384 days long. Cheshvan has 29 days while Kislev has 30 days. The Hebrew letter כ "kaf" is used in the kevi'ah.
A  year ("complete" or "perfect", also "abundant") is 355 or 385 days long. Both Cheshvan and Kislev have 30 days. The Hebrew letter ש "shin" is used in the kevi'ah.

Whether a year is deficient, regular, or complete is determined by the time between two adjacent Rosh Hashanah observances and the leap year.

A Metonic cycle equates to 235 lunar months in each 19-year cycle. This gives an average of 6,939 days, 16 hours, and 595 parts for each cycle. But due to the Rosh Hashanah postponement rules (preceding section) a cycle of 19 Jewish years can be either 6,939, 6,940, 6,941, or 6,942 days in duration. Since none of these values is evenly divisible by seven, the Jewish calendar repeats exactly only following 36,288 Metonic cycles, or 689,472 Jewish years. There is a near-repetition every 247 years, except for an excess of 50 minutes  seconds (905 parts).

The four gates  
The annual calendar of a numbered Hebrew year, displayed as 12 or 13 months partitioned into weeks, can be determined by consulting the table of Four gates, whose inputs are the year's position in the 19-year cycle and its molad Tishrei. The resulting type of the desired year in the body of the table is a triple consisting of two numbers and a letter (written left-to-right in English). The year within the 19-year cycle alone determines whether that year has one or two Adars.

The years of a 19-year cycle are organized into four groups: common years after a leap year but before a common year ; common years between two leap years ; common years after a common year but before a leap year ; and leap years , all between common years. The oldest surviving table of Four gates was written by Muhammad ibn Musa al-Khwarizmi in 824. It is so named because it identifies the four allowable days of the week on which  can occur.

Comparing the days of the week of molad Tishrei with those in the  shows that during 39% of years  is not postponed beyond the day of the week of its molad Tishrei, 47% are postponed one day, and 14% are postponed two days. This table also identifies the seven types of common years and seven types of leap years. Most are represented in any 19-year cycle, except one or two may be in neighboring cycles. The most likely type of year is 5R7 in 18.1% of years, whereas the least likely is 5C1 in 3.3% of years.

Holidays 
See Jewish and Israeli holidays 2000–2050

Other calendars
Outside of Rabbinic Judaism, evidence shows a diversity of practice.

Karaite calendar
Karaites use the lunar month and the solar year, but the Karaite calendar differs from the current Rabbinic calendar in a number of ways. The Karaite calendar is identical to the Rabbinic calendar used before the Sanhedrin changed the Rabbinic calendar from the lunar, observation based, calendar to the current, mathematically based, calendar used in Rabbinic Judaism today.

In the lunar Karaite calendar, the beginning of each month, the Rosh Chodesh, can be calculated, but is confirmed by the observation in Israel of the first sightings of the new moon. This may result in an occasional variation of a maximum of one day, depending on the inability to observe the new moon. The day is usually "picked up" in the next month.

The addition of the leap month (Adar II) is determined by observing in Israel the ripening of barley at a specific stage (defined by Karaite tradition) (called aviv), rather than using the calculated and fixed calendar of rabbinic Judaism. Occasionally this results in Karaites being one month ahead of other Jews using the calculated rabbinic calendar. The "lost" month would be "picked up" in the next cycle when Karaites would observe a leap month while other Jews would not.

Furthermore, the seasonal drift of the rabbinic calendar is avoided, resulting in the years affected by the drift starting one month earlier in the Karaite calendar.

Also, the four rules of postponement of the rabbinic calendar are not applied, since they are not mentioned in the Tanakh. This can affect the dates observed for all the Jewish holidays in a particular year by one or two days.

In the Middle Ages many Karaite Jews outside Israel followed the calculated rabbinic calendar, because it was not possible to retrieve accurate aviv barley data from the land of Israel. However, since the establishment of the State of Israel, and especially since the Six-Day War, the Karaite Jews that have made aliyah can now again use the observational calendar.

Samaritan calendar
The Samaritan community's calendar also relies on lunar months and solar years. Calculation of the Samaritan calendar has historically been a secret reserved to the priestly family alone, and was based on observations of the new crescent moon. More recently, a 20th-century Samaritan High Priest transferred the calculation to a computer algorithm. The current High Priest confirms the results twice a year, and then distributes calendars to the community.

The epoch of the Samaritan calendar is year of the entry of the Children of Israel into the Land of Israel with Joshua. The month of Passover is the first month in the Samaritan calendar, but the year number increments in the sixth month. Like in the Rabbinic calendar, there are seven leap years within each 19-year cycle. However, the Rabbinic and Samaritan calendars' cycles are not synchronized, so Samaritan festivals—notionally the same as the Rabbinic festivals of Torah origin—are frequently one month off from the date according to the Rabbinic calendar. Additionally, as in the Karaite calendar, the Samaritan calendar does not apply the four rules of postponement, since they are not mentioned in the Tanakh. This can affect the dates observed for all the Jewish holidays in a particular year by one or two days.

The Qumran calendar

Many of the Dead Sea Scrolls have references to a unique calendar, used by the people there, who are often assumed to be Essenes.

The year of this calendar used the ideal Mesopotamian calendar of twelve 30-day months, to which were added 4 days at the equinoxes and solstices (cardinal points), making a total of 364 days.

There was some ambiguity as to whether the cardinal days were at the beginning of the months or at the end, but the clearest calendar attestations give a year of four seasons, each having three months of 30, 30, and 31 days with the cardinal day the extra day at the end, for a total of 91 days, or exactly 13 weeks. Each season started on the 4th day of the week (Wednesday), every year.

With only 364 days, the calendar would be very noticeably different from the actual seasons after a few years, but there is nothing to indicate what was done about this problem. Various suggestions have been made by scholars. One is that nothing was done and the calendar was allowed to change with respect to the seasons. Another suggestion is that changes were made irregularly, only when the seasonal anomaly was too great to be ignored any longer.

The writings often discuss the moon, but the calendar was not based on the movement of the moon any more than indications of the phases of the moon on a modern western calendar indicate that that is a lunar calendar. Recent analysis of one of the last scrolls remaining to be deciphered has revealed it relates to this calendar and that the sect used the word tekufah to identify each of the four special days marking the transitions between the seasons.

Other calendars used by ancient Jews
Calendrical evidence for the postexilic Persian period is found in papyri from the Jewish colony at Elephantine, in Egypt. These documents show that the Jewish community of Elephantine used the Egyptian and Babylonian calendars.

The Sardica paschal table shows that the Jewish community of some eastern city, possibly Antioch, used a calendrical scheme that kept Nisan 14 within the limits of the Julian month of March. Some of the dates in the document are clearly corrupt, but they can be emended to make the sixteen years in the table consistent with a regular intercalation scheme. Peter, the bishop of Alexandria (early 4th century CE), mentions that the Jews of his city "hold their Passover according to the course of the moon in the month of Phamenoth, or according to the intercalary month every third year in the month of Pharmuthi", suggesting a fairly consistent intercalation scheme that kept Nisan 14 approximately between Phamenoth 10 (March 6 in the 4th century CE) and Pharmuthi 10 (April 5).

Jewish funerary inscriptions from Zoar (south of the Dead Sea), dated from the 3rd to the 5th century, indicate that when years were intercalated, the intercalary month was at least sometimes a repeated month of Adar. The inscriptions, however, reveal no clear pattern of regular intercalations, nor do they indicate any consistent rule for determining the start of the lunar month.

Astronomical calculations

Synodic month – the molad interval
A "new moon" (astronomically called a lunar conjunction and, in Hebrew, a molad) is the moment at which the sun and moon are aligned horizontally with respect to a north-south line (technically, they have the same ecliptical longitude). The period between two new moons is a synodic month. The actual length of a synodic month varies from about 29 days 6 hours and 30 minutes (29.27 days) to about 29 days and 20 hours (29.83 days), a variation range of about 13 hours and 30 minutes. Accordingly, for convenience, the Hebrew calendar uses a long-term average month length, identical to the mean synodic month of ancient times (also called the molad interval). The molad interval is  days, or 29 days, 12 hours, and 793 "parts" (1 "part" = 1/18 minute; 3 "parts" = 10 seconds) (i.e., 29.530594 days), and is the same value determined by the Babylonians in their System B about 300 BCE and was adopted by the Greek astronomer Hipparchus in the 2nd century BCE and by the Alexandrian astronomer Ptolemy in the Almagest four centuries later (who cited Hipparchus as his source). Its remarkable accuracy (less than one second from the true value) is thought to have been achieved using records of lunar eclipses from the 8th to 5th centuries BCE.

Furthermore, the discrepancy between the molad interval and the mean synodic month is accumulating at an accelerating rate, since the mean synodic month is progressively shortening due to gravitational tidal effects. Measured on a strictly uniform time scale (such as that provided by an atomic clock) the mean synodic month is becoming gradually longer, but since the tides slow Earth's rotation rate even more, the mean synodic month is becoming gradually shorter in terms of mean solar time.

Seasonal drift
The mean year of the current mathematically based Hebrew calendar is 365 days 5 hours 55 minutes and 25+25/57 seconds (365.2468 days) – computed as the molad/monthly interval of 29.530594 days × 235 months in a 19-year metonic cycle ÷ 19 years per cycle. In relation to the Gregorian calendar, the mean Gregorian calendar year is 365 days 5 hours 49 minutes and 12 seconds (365.2425 days), and the drift of the Hebrew calendar in relation to it is about a day every 231 years.

Implications for Jewish ritual
Although the molad of Tishrei is the only molad moment that is not ritually announced, it is actually the only one that is relevant to the Hebrew calendar, for it determines the provisional date of Rosh Hashanah, subject to the Rosh Hashanah postponement rules. The other monthly molad moments are announced for mystical reasons. With the moladot on average almost 100 minutes late, this means that the molad of Tishrei lands one day later than it ought to in (100 minutes) ÷ (1440 minutes per day) = 5 of 72 years or nearly 7% of years.

Therefore, the seemingly small drift of the moladot is already significant enough to affect the date of Rosh Hashanah, which then cascades to many other dates in the calendar year and sometimes, due to the Rosh Hashanah postponement rules, also interacts with the dates of the prior or next year. The molad drift could be corrected by using a progressively shorter molad interval that corresponds to the actual mean lunar conjunction interval at the original molad reference meridian. Furthermore, the molad interval determines the calendar mean year, so using a progressively shorter molad interval would help correct the excessive length of the Hebrew calendar mean year, as well as helping it to "hold onto" the northward equinox for the maximum duration.

When the 19-year intercalary cycle was finalised in the 4th century, the earliest Passover (in year 16 of the cycle) coincided with the northward equinox, which means that Passover fell near the first full moon after the northward equinox, or that the northward equinox landed within one lunation before 16 days after the molad of Nisan. This is still the case in about 80% of years; but, in about 20% of years, Passover is a month late by these criteria (as it was in AM 5765, 5768 and 5776, the 8th, 11th and 19th years of the 19-year cycle = Gregorian 2005, 2008 and 2016 CE). Presently, this occurs after the "premature" insertion of a leap month in years 8, 11, and 19 of each 19-year cycle, which causes the northward equinox to land on exceptionally early Hebrew dates in such years. This problem will get worse over time, and so beginning in AM 5817 (2057 CE), year 3 of each 19-year cycle will also be a month late. If the calendar is not amended, then Passover will start to land on or after the summer solstice around AM 16652 (12892 CE). In theory, the exact year when this will begin to occur depends on uncertainties in the future tidal slowing of the Earth rotation rate, and on the accuracy of predictions of precession and Earth axial tilt. The seriousness of the spring equinox drift is widely discounted on the grounds that Passover will remain in the spring season for many millennia, and the text of the Torah is generally not interpreted as having specified tight calendrical limits. The Hebrew calendar also drifts with respect to the autumn equinox, and at least part of the harvest festival of Sukkot is already more than a month after the equinox in years 1, 9, and 12 of each 19-year cycle; beginning in AM 5818 (2057 CE), this will also be the case in year 4. (These are the same year numbers as were mentioned for the spring season in the previous paragraph, except that they get incremented at Rosh Hashanah.) This progressively increases the probability that Sukkot will be cold and wet, making it uncomfortable or impractical to dwell in the traditional succah during Sukkot. The first winter seasonal prayer for rain is not recited until Shemini Atzeret, after the end of Sukkot, yet it is becoming increasingly likely that the rainy season in Israel will start before the end of Sukkot.

No equinox or solstice will ever be more than a day or so away from its mean date according to the solar calendar, while nineteen Jewish years average 6939d 16h 33m 03s compared to the 6939d 14h 26m 15s of nineteen mean tropical years. This discrepancy has amounted to six days, which is why the earliest Passover currently falls on 26 March (as in AM 5773 / 2013 CE).

Worked example
Given the length of the year, the length of each month is fixed as described above, so the real problem in determining the calendar for a year is determining the number of days in the year. In the modern calendar, this is determined in the following manner.

The day of Rosh Hashanah and the length of the year are determined by the time and the day of the week of the Tishrei molad, that is, the moment of the average conjunction. Given the Tishrei molad of a certain year, the length of the year is determined as follows:

First, one must determine whether each year is an ordinary or leap year by its position in the 19-year Metonic cycle. Years 3, 6, 8, 11, 14, 17, and 19 are leap years.

Secondly, one must determine the number of days between the starting Tishrei molad (TM1) and the Tishrei molad of the next year (TM2). For calendar descriptions in general the day begins at 6 p.m., but for the purpose of determining Rosh Hashanah, a molad occurring on or after noon is treated as belonging to the next day (the first deḥiyyah). All months are calculated as 29d, 12h, 44m, 3s long (MonLen). Therefore, in an ordinary year TM2 occurs 12 × MonLen days after TM1. This is usually 354 calendar days after TM1, but if TM1 is on or after 3:11:20 a.m. and before noon, it will be 355 days. Similarly, in a leap year, TM2 occurs 13 × MonLen days after TM1. This is usually 384 days after TM1, but if TM1 is on or after noon and before 2:27:16 p.m., TM2 will be only 383 days after TM1. In the same way, from TM2 one calculates TM3. Thus the four natural year lengths are 354, 355, 383, and 384 days.

However, because of the holiday rules, Rosh Hashanah cannot fall on a Sunday, Wednesday, or Friday, so if TM2 is one of those days, Rosh Hashanah in year 2 is postponed by adding one day to year 1 (the second deḥiyyah). To compensate, one day is subtracted from year 2. It is to allow for these adjustments that the system allows 385-day years (long leap) and 353-day years (short ordinary) besides the four natural year lengths.

But how can year 1 be lengthened if it is already a long ordinary year of 355 days or year 2 be shortened if it is a short leap year of 383 days? That is why the third and fourth deḥiyyahs are needed.

If year 1 is already a long ordinary year of 355 days, there will be a problem if TM1 is on a Tuesday, as that means TM2 falls on a Sunday and will have to be postponed, creating a 356-day year. In this case, Rosh Hashanah in year 1 is postponed from Tuesday (the third deḥiyyah). As it cannot be postponed to Wednesday, it is postponed to Thursday, and year 1 ends up with 354 days.

On the other hand, if year 2 is already a short year of 383 days, there will be a problem if TM2 is on a Wednesday. because Rosh Hashanah in year 2 will have to be postponed from Wednesday to Thursday and this will cause year 2 to be only 382 days long. In this case, year 2 is extended by one day by postponing Rosh Hashanah in year 3 from Monday to Tuesday (the fourth deḥiyyah), and year 2 will have 383 days.

Rectifying the Hebrew calendar
Given the importance in Jewish ritual of establishing the accurate timing of monthly and annual times, some futurist writers and researchers have considered whether a "corrected" system of establishing the Hebrew date is required. The mean year of the current mathematically based Hebrew calendar has "drifted" an average of 7–8 days late relative to the equinox relationship that it originally had. It is not possible, however, for any individual Hebrew date to be a week or more "late", because Hebrew months always begin within a day or two of the molad moment. What happens instead is that the traditional Hebrew calendar "prematurely" inserts a leap month one year before it "should have been" inserted, where "prematurely" means that the insertion causes the spring equinox to land more than 30 days before the latest acceptable moment, thus causing the calendar to run "one month late" until the time when the leap month "should have been" inserted prior to the following spring. This presently happens in 4 years out of every 19-year cycle (years 3, 8, 11, and 19), implying that the Hebrew calendar currently runs "one month late" more than 21% of the time.

Dr. Irv Bromberg has proposed a 353-year cycle of 4,366 months, which would include 130 leap months, along with use of a progressively shorter molad interval, which would keep an amended fixed arithmetic Hebrew calendar from drifting for more than seven millennia. It takes about 3 centuries for the spring equinox to drift an average of th of a molad interval earlier in the Hebrew calendar. That is a very important time unit, because it can be cancelled by simply truncating a 19-year cycle to 11 years, omitting 8 years including three leap years from the sequence. That is the essential feature of the 353-year leap cycle..

Another suggestion is to delay the leap years gradually so that a whole intercalary month is taken out at the end of Iggul 21; another is to adopt the synodic month to be the more accurate 29.53058868 days, thus the length of the year would be (235*13*26-1)/(19*13*26) = 365.2426 days, very close to the actual 365.2422 days of the tropical year. The result is the "Hebrew Calendar" in the program CalMaster2000.

Religious questions abound about how such a system might be implemented and administered throughout the diverse aspects of the world Jewish community.

Calendar observance in Auschwitz 
While imprisoned in Auschwitz, Jews made every effort to observe Jewish tradition in the camps, despite the monumental dangers in doing so. The Hebrew calendar, which is a tradition with great importance to Jewish practice and rituals was particularly dangerous since no tools of telling of time, such as watches and calendars were permitted in the camps. The keeping of a Hebrew calendar was a rarity amongst prisoners and there are only two known surviving calendars that were made in Auschwitz, both of which were made by women. Before this, the tradition of making a Hebrew calendar was greatly assumed to be the job of a man in Jewish society.

Usage in contemporary Israel

Early Zionist pioneers were impressed by the fact that the calendar preserved by Jews over many centuries in far-flung diasporas, as a matter of religious ritual, was geared to the climate of their original country: the Jewish New Year marks the transition from the dry season to the rainy one, and major Jewish holidays such as Sukkot, Passover, and Shavuot correspond to major points of the country's agricultural year such as planting and harvest.

Accordingly, in the early 20th century the Hebrew calendar was re-interpreted as an agricultural rather than religious calendar.

After the creation of the State of Israel, the Hebrew calendar became one of the official calendars of Israel, along with the Gregorian calendar. Holidays and commemorations not derived from previous Jewish tradition were to be fixed according to the Hebrew calendar date. For example, the Israeli Independence Day falls on 5 Iyar, Jerusalem Reunification Day on 28 Iyar, Yom HaAliyah on 10 Nisan, and the Holocaust Commemoration Day on 27 Nisan.

The Hebrew calendar is still widely acknowledged, appearing in public venues such as banks (where it is legal for use on cheques and other documents), and on the mastheads of newspapers.

The Jewish New Year (Rosh Hashanah) is a two-day public holiday in Israel. However, since the 1980s an increasing number of secular Israelis celebrate the Gregorian New Year (usually known as "Silvester Night"—) on the night between 31 December and 1 January. Prominent rabbis have on several occasions sharply denounced this practice, but with no noticeable effect on the secularist celebrants.

Wall calendars commonly used in Israel are hybrids. Most are organised according to Gregorian rather than Jewish months, but begin in September, when the Jewish New Year usually falls, and provide the Jewish date in small characters.

See also

 Biblical and Talmudic units of measurement
 Chronology of the Bible
 Gezer calendar
 Hebrew astronomy
 Jewish astrology
 Jewish and Israeli holidays 2000–2050
 List of observances set by the Hebrew calendar

Notes

References

Bibliography

 al-Biruni.  The Chronology of Ancient Nations, Chapter VII. tr. C. Edward Sachau. London, 1879.
 Ari Belenkiy. "A Unique Feature of the Jewish Calendar – Dehiyot". Culture and Cosmos 6 (2002) 3–22.
 Jonathan Ben-Dov. Head of All Years: Astronomy and Calendars at Qumran in their Ancient Context. Leiden: Brill, 2008.
 Bonnie Blackburn and Leofranc Holford-Strevens. The Oxford Companion to the Year: An Exploration of Calendar Customs and Time-reckoning. US: Oxford University Press; 2000.
 Sherrard Beaumont Burnaby. Elements of the Jewish and Muhammadan Calendars. George Bell and Sons, London, 1901 – Internet Archive link.
 Nathan Bushwick. Understanding the Jewish Calendar. Moznaim, New York/Jerusalem, 1989. 
 William Moses Feldman. Rabbinical Mathematics and Astronomy, 3rd edition, Sepher-Hermon Press, New York, 1978.
 Eduard Mahler, Handbuch der jüdischen Chronologie. Buchhandlung Gustav Fock, Leipzig, 1916.
 Helen R. Jacobus. Zodiac Calendars in the Dead Sea Scrolls and Their Reception: Ancient Astronomy and Astrology in Early Judaism. Leiden: Brill, 2014. 
 Otto Neugebauer. Ethiopic astronomy and computus. Österreichische Akademie der Wissenschaften, philosophisch-historische Klasse, Sitzungsberichte 347. Vienna, 1979.
 The Code of Maimonides (Mishneh Torah), Book Three, Treatise Eight: Sanctification of the New Moon. Translated by Solomon Gandz. Yale Judaica Series Volume XI, Yale University Press, New Haven, Conn., 1956.
 Samuel Poznanski. "Calendar (Jewish)". Encyclopædia of Religion and Ethics. T. & T. Clark, Edinburgh, 1910, vol. 3, pp. 117–124.
 Edward M. Reingold and Nachum Dershowitz. Calendrical Calculations: The Millennium Edition. Cambridge University Press; 2 edition (2001).  723–730.
 Louis A. Resnikoff. "Jewish Calendar Calculations", Scripta Mathematica 9 (1943) 191–195, 274–277.
 Eduard Schwartz, Christliche und jüdische Ostertafeln (Abhandlungen der königlichen Gesellschaft der Wissenschaften zu Göttingen. Philologisch-Historische Klasse. Neue Folge, Band viii), Berlin, 1905 – Internet Archive link.
 Arthur Spier. The Comprehensive Hebrew Calendar: Twentieth to the Twenty-Second Century 5660–5860/1900–2100. Feldheim Publishers, Jerusalem/New York, 1986.
 
 Ernest Wiesenberg. "Appendix: Addenda and Corrigenda to Treatise VIII". The Code of Maimonides (Mishneh Torah), Book Three: The Book of Seasons. Yale Judaica Series Volume XIV, Yale University Press, New Haven, Conn., 1961. pp. 557–602.
 Francis Henry Woods. "Calendar (Hebrew)", Encyclopædia of Religion and Ethics. T. & T. Clark, Edinburgh, 1910, vol. 3, pp. 108–109.

External links
 Chabad.org: Introduction to the Jewish Calendar
 Hebcal.com: Jewish Holiday Calendars & Hebrew Date Converter
 Aish.com: Jewish Calendar
 Tripod.com: Hebrew Calendar Science and Myths
 Yeshiva.co: Jewish Calendar with Halachic times date converter and daf yomi

Date converters
 TorahCalc.com: Molad Calculator
 Kaluach.org: Hebrew Date Converter
 Hebcal Hebrew Date Converter
 Chabad.org: Jewish/Hebrew Date Converter
 University of Toronto: The "Kalendis" Calendar Calculator
 Calendar-Converter.com: Jewish/Hebrew Calendar Converter
 

 
Lunisolar calendars